Kursīši Parish is an administrative unit of Saldus Municipality, Latvia.

Towns, villages and settlements of Kursīši Parish

References 

Parishes of Latvia
Saldus Municipality
Courland